Line 3 is a rapid transit line of the Santiago Metro. Traveling from La Reina in the east towards the center, and Quilicura in the North, Line 3 was originally intended to open in the late 1980s, but the 1985 Algarrobo Earthquake hampered its construction, and a subsequent urban explosion in Puente Alto and Maipú (in the far southeast and mid-southwest respectively) further put its construction on hold, until in the early 2010s construction started. The first phase of the project includes 18 stations, which were completed and opened to the public on 22 January 2019. The second phase, composed of a three-station extension towards the main square of Quilicura, should open by 2023. Its color on the map is chocolate.

History

Line 3 was initially planned for construction after Lines 1 and 2 but the 1985 Algarrobo earthquake near Santiago meant work on the new line had to be postponed so that the resources could be used to rebuild the damage caused by the earthquake. In the 1990s, Santiago's transportation needs changed dramatically with a population explosion in the south of the city, especially the communes of La Florida, Chile and Puente Alto, and the plans for Line 3 were postponed again in favour of Line 5, Line 4 and Line 4A in the south.

Despite this, there are pockets of Line 3 works hidden around Santiago, such as the Ghost Station under Puente Cal y Canto station, located to the east of the line 2 side of the station, where works were carried out for years.

In 2010, another new line was announced, Line 6, which once again saw the construction of Line 3 pushed back. Criticism of this delay led finally to the announcement of a new Line 3 construction project by the Chilean government on October 5, 2010. An initial length of track and 18 stations were announced in July 2011, with an extension of 1.7 km announced in May 2012, connecting to an extra station at the Military Hospital. This will provide access to the hospital itself, to Eulogio Sánchez Airport (better known as Tobalaba Airfield), and to the commune of La Reina, and close to Peñalolén.
 
Line 3 connects with all Santiago Metro lines except for Line 4A. It connects with Line 1 at Universidad de Chile station, with Line 2 and the future Line 7 at Puente Cal y Canto station, with Line 4 at Plaza Egaña station and with Line 5 at Plaza de Armas station and Irarrázaval station. It also connects with Line 6 at Ñuñoa station once Line 3. Its distinctive colour on the network line map is brown.

Three more stations are scheduled to be open in 2023, in the commune of Quilicura on the north; however, the expansion to Hospital Militar in La Reina was again dismissed. On January 22, the president Piñera announced that the Hospital Militar station will be constructed after the Lines 7, 8 and 9, are completed in 2028.

Innovations
Line 3 complies with high security and passenger comfort standards. The new security measures include cameras inside the trains, an overhead (catenary) electric transmission line, auto-drive, doors located on the platform, air conditioning in the trains and connections with suburban trains.

Although Line 3 did not suffer any damage in the October 2019 protests (with the exception of Cardenal Caro, which suffered minor damage), Line 3 was nonetheless closed on the weekend of October 18, 2019, due to security issues. Service on Line 3 was partially resumed on October 23, with full service to all stations being established in 2020.

Communes served by Line 3

Line 3 serves the following Santiago communes from north to east:
 
 Quilicura
 Huechuraba (Indirectly)
 Conchalí
 Independencia
 Recoleta (Indirectly)
 Santiago
 Ñuñoa
 La Reina

Stations

Line 3 stations, from west to east, are:

Line 3 data sheet

 Terminal Communes:Quilicura – La Reina
 Track:
 Independencia Avenue: 7 Stations
 Bandera Avenue: 2 station
 San Diego Avenue: 2 stations
 Irarrázaval Avenue: 6 stations
 Larraín Avenue: 2 stations
 Construction Method:
 Underground
 Opening Dates:
 2019 (Los Libertadores - Fernando Castillo Velasco)
 2023 (Los Libertadores - Plaza de Quilicura)
 Rolling stock: CAF-Thales AS-2014

See also 
List of metro systems
Rail transport in Chile
Transantiago

References

External links

 Metro S.A.
 UrbanRail.net/Santiago
 Santiago Metro Track Map
 Tarjeta Bip!
 Plan and Authority of Transit of Santiago de Chile, Transantiago

 
2019 establishments in Chile
Railway lines opened in 2019
750 V DC railway electrification